Tepparith Singwancha or Tepparith Kokietgym (born November 22, 1988) is a Thai former professional boxer in the super flyweight division. He was the World Boxing Association (WBA) super flyweight champion from 2011 to 2012.

Boxing career 
Singwancha won the interim title on May 1, 2011, in Phetchaburi against Drian Francisco and was elevated to full champion in November of that year.

He beat Japanese boxers in Japan three consecutive times, facing Daiki Kameda (December 2011), Tomonobu Shimizu (April 2012; eliminator fight), and Nobuo Nashiro (September 2012), he earned a nickname from journalists "Japan Killer".

At the end of 2012, he was defeated by TKO (referee stopped the contest, judging that Tepparith wasn't in position to continue fighting after being knocked down three times) in the fourth round against Kohei Kono at Ota-City General Gymnasium, Tokyo.

Kickboxing career 
Before starting his boxing career Tepparith trained and competed in Muay Thai under the name Theparith Wor.Singsanae (เทพฤทธิ์ ว.สิงห์เสน่ห์), he had over 200 fights for 160 wins. After the end of his professional boxing career in 2016, Tepparith went to live in Japan to work as a trainer and started competing in kickboxing rules under the ring name "Tepparith JoeGym" (テーパリット・ジョウジム). After two quick first round KO wins Tepparith faced high level competition in RISE champion Masahiko Suzuki who he fought at RISE World Series 2021 Osaka on July 17, 2021. He lost by unanimous decision.

Boxing record

Kickboxing and Muay Thai record

|-  style="text-align:center; background:#fbb;"
| 2022-02-23|| Loss||align=left| Kazuma || RISE 155|| Tokyo, Japan || TKO (Punches) || 2 ||1:10
|-  style="background:#cfc;"
| 2021-11-28|| Win ||align=left| Hiroto ichimura|| Rizin Trigger 1 || Kobe, Japan || KO (Right hook) || 2 ||2:54

|-  style="text-align:center; background:#fbb;"
| 2021-07-18|| Loss||align=left| Masahiko Suzuki || RISE WORLD SERIES 2021 Osaka|| Osaka, Japan || Decision (Unanimous) || 3 ||3:00

|-  style="text-align:center; background:#cfc;"
| 2020-06-06|| Win||align=left| Minoru Asahino || Kakutou no Omochabako ACF 60th ～Living legendary fighters～|| Osaka, Japan || KO || 1 ||2:55

|-  style="text-align:center; background:#cfc;"
| 2020-12-20|| Win||align=left| Taichi Morimoto || Kakutou no Omochabako ACF 55th|| Osaka, Japan || TKO (Punches) || 1 ||2:32

|-  style="text-align:center; background:#fbb;"
| 2018-12-16|| Loss||align=left| Kiyoto Takahashi || Japan Kickboxing Innovation - Okayama Gym show 5, Quarter Final|| Okayama, Japan || Decision (Unanimous) || 3 ||3:00 
|-
| colspan=9 | Legend:

References

External links 

Living people
Super-flyweight boxers
1988 births
Tepparith Singwancha
Tepparith Singwancha